Steve Nagy (August 10, 1913 - November 10, 1966) was an American professional bowler from Cleveland, Ohio.

Early life

Steve Nagy was born on August 10, 1913, in the small mining town of Shoaf, Pennsylvania. His family moved to Cleveland, Ohio, when he was eight years old. When Nagy was eleven, he worked at a bowling alley as a pinsetter.

Bowling career
Nagy’s bowling career started in 1939, when he competed at the American Bowling Congress tournament in Cleveland. In 1952, the Bowling Writers Association of America named him Bowler of the Year. In 1954, he was a contestant on NBC’s Championship Bowling where he rolled a perfect game. A few months later, he was the winner of the 1955 Bowling Proprietor's Association of America All-Star competition. In 1963, he was inducted into the American Bowling Congress hall of fame.

Death
In 1965, Nagy was hospitalized after suffering a stroke. He died on November 10, 1966.

References

External links
 
 
American ten-pin bowling players
1913 births
1966 deaths
People from Cleveland